Scratch my Back is a 1920 American silent comedy film produced by Eminent Authors Pictures and distributed by Goldwyn Pictures. Adapted by Rupert Hughes from one of his story, the film was directed by Sidney Olcott with T. Roy Barnes and Helene Chadwick in the leading roles. It is not known whether the film currently survives.

This film is preserved in a copy prepared by Metro-Goldwyn-Mayer.

Plot
As described in a film magazine, Val Romney (Barnes), a young society man who does about as he pleases, is at a society function when he has a predicament of having an itching back and being unable to get any relief. Meanwhile, Madeline (Chadwick) is in a French boarding school from which she runs away and goes to London and becomes a dancer. When she tires of that life she returns to her father, an American living in Paris. On her way home she meets a young American whom she later marries without telling him of her escapades in London. Later, they are a married couple living in the United States when, during one night at the opera, they are seated in front of Val. Madeline is annoyed by an itchy back and Val, remembering that he was once in this discomfort, impulsively leans forward and scratches her shoulder. She writes him a note of thanks and asks him to call on her. The next day she tells him of her London experiences and says her former dance partner is trying to blackmail her. She dares not tell her husband and asks Val for help. She and Val plot to outwit the blackmailer. They succeed, but arouse the jealousy of her husband. Eventually things are straightened out when the husband tells Madeline that he knew of her secret about her time in London all along.

Cast
T. Roy Barnes as Val Romney
Lloyd T. Whitlock as Loton
Helene Chadwick as Madeline
Andrew Robson as Mr. Secor
Cesare Gravina as Jahoda

Production
The film was shot in Goldwyn studios in Culver City, California.

In Culver City, Olcott received on the set the prestigious visit of Maurice Maeterlinck, Belgian poet, Nobel prize of literature 1911.

References

External links

 Scratch my Back, sur sidneyolcott.com

1920 films
American silent feature films
Films directed by Sidney Olcott
1920 comedy films
Silent American comedy films
American black-and-white films
1920s American films